Medionops is a genus of araneomorph spiders in the family Caponiidae, first described by A. Sánchez-Ruiz & Antônio Domingos Brescovit in 2017.

Species
 it contains seven species:
Medionops blades Sánchez-Ruiz & Brescovit, 2017 — Colombia
Medionops cesari (Dupérré, 2014) — Ecuador
Medionops claudiae Sánchez-Ruiz & Brescovit, 2017 — Brazil
Medionops murici Sánchez-Ruiz & Brescovit, 2017 — Brazil
Medionops ramirezi Sánchez-Ruiz & Brescovit, 2017 — Brazil
Medionops simla (Chickering, 1967) — Panama, Trinidad
Medionops tabay Sánchez-Ruiz & Brescovit, 2017 — Venezuela

References

External links

Araneomorphae genera
Caponiidae